Martin van Geel (born 27 November 1960 in Goirle) is a retired Dutch footballer who was active as a midfielder. Van Geel made his professional debut on at 24 August 1977 Willem II, and also played for Ajax, Roda JC and Feyenoord.

Honours
Ajax
 Eredivisie: 1979–80

External links
 Profile

1960 births
Living people
Dutch footballers
Dutch businesspeople
Directors of football clubs in the Netherlands
Feyenoord players
Willem II (football club) players
AFC Ajax players
Roda JC Kerkrade players
Eredivisie players
Eerste Divisie players
Association football midfielders
People from Goirle
Willem II (football club) non-playing staff
AZ Alkmaar non-playing staff
AFC Ajax non-playing staff
Roda JC Kerkrade non-playing staff
Feyenoord non-playing staff
Footballers from North Brabant